Line 8 of the Tianjin Metro is a rapid transit line running from northwest to southeast Tianjin. The Phase I south section of line 8, which was originally called Line 6 Phase 2 during construction, was opened on 28 December 2021. The line is currently 13.42 km long and has 9 stations.

This is the first metro line in Tianjin that uses Type A six car, GoA4 automated trains.

Opening timeline

Stations (northwest to southeast)

References

Tianjin Metro lines
Railway lines opened in 2021
2021 establishments in China
Automated guideway transit